The Lake Shore House in Glenbrook, Nevada is a historic hotel by Lake Tahoe that was built in 1863 and moved in 1906.  It was listed on the National Register of Historic Places in 1979.

References 

Hotel buildings completed in 1863
National Register of Historic Places in Douglas County, Nevada
Hotel buildings on the National Register of Historic Places in Nevada